Philip II (5 February 1438 – 7 November 1497), surnamed the Landless, was the Duke of Savoy for a brief reign from 1496 to 1497.

Biography

Philip was the granduncle of the previous duke Charles II, and the youngest surviving son of Duke Louis of Savoy and Anne of Cyprus. However, he was not the heir general of the previous duke, there being several females before him in the line of succession. To ensure male inheritance to the Savoy line, his eldest son Philibert was married to his cousin, the only sister of the deceased young Duke. However, the plan did not succeed: the girl died at age twelve. (Philip had already died in the meantime.) The children of the daughters of Philip's eldest brother Duke Amedeo IX of Savoy were next in line, and were entitled to the inheritance of the line of heirs-general, including Cyprus and Jerusalem. Despite the fact that Cyprus and Jerusalem did not bar succession in female line, Philip took those claims and used those titles as well. His male successors in Savoy also continued to do so, thus giving their ducal title a higher, royal titulary.

He spent most of his life as a junior member of the ducal family. His original apanage was the district of Bresse, close to the French and Burgundian border, but it was lost and therefore Philip received his sobriquet "the Landless", or "Lackland".

Family

First marriage
He married Margaret of Bourbon (5 February 1438 – 1483) and had:
 Louise (1476–1531), married Charles d'Orléans, Count of Angoulême, had children including:
Francis I of France whose daughter Margaret of Valois married to Emanuele Filiberto of Savoy.
Marguerite of Navarre (1492–1549); Queen consort of King Henry II of Navarre
 Girolamo (1478)
 Philibert II (1480–1504)

Second marriage
He married Claudine de Brosse of Brittany (1450–1513), daughter of Jean II de Brosse and Nicole de Châtillon, and they had:
 Charles III (1486–1553) who succeeded his half-brother as Duke of Savoy
 Louis (1488–1502)
 Philip (1490–1533), duke of Nemours
 Assolone (1494)
 Giovanni Amedeo (1495)
 Philiberta (1498–1524), married Julian II di Medici (1479–1516), duke of Nemours

Illegitimate issue
He also had eight illegitimate children by two mistresses.

With Libera Portoneri:
René of Savoy (1468-31 March 1525), served as Governor of Nice and Provence, known as the Grand Bastard of Savoy and father-in-law of Anne, 1st Duc de Montmorency
Antonia of Savoy, married Jean II, Lord of Monaco
Peter of Savoy, Bishop of Geneva

With Bona di Romagnano:
Claudina (Claudia) of Savoy (d. 2 May 1528),  married to Jacob III, Count of Horne (d. 15 August 1531).
Margherita (Margaret) of Savoy
Giovanna (Johanna) of Savoy
Michele (Michael) of Savoy, a priest

Philip is an ancestor, through an illegitimate daughter of Honorat II of Savoy,  of Joséphine de Beauharnais, first wife of Napoleon.

Ancestry

References

Sources

1438 births
1497 deaths
15th-century Dukes of Savoy
People from Chambéry
Princes of Savoy
Counts of Geneva
Claimant Kings of Jerusalem
Savoy, Philip II, Duke of
Italian people of Cypriot descent
Grand Masters of France
Burials at Hautecombe Abbey